Oldřich Buchar (1 June 1891 – 20 May 1973) was a Czechoslovak equestrian. He competed in two events at the 1924 Summer Olympics.

References

External links
 

1891 births
1973 deaths
Czechoslovak male equestrians
Olympic equestrians of Czechoslovakia
Equestrians at the 1924 Summer Olympics
Place of birth missing